Last Go Round is a 1994 novel written by Ken Kesey and Ken Babbs. It was Kesey's last novel and is about the famous "Last Go Round" that took place at the original Pendleton Round-Up in 1911.  The book contains references to real historical figures, and was published with photographs from the early days of the Pendleton rodeo. However, the story is written as a tall tale, with characters and feats that are larger than life.

References 
Henderson, David W.(1994) From Library Journal 

Fiction set in 1911

1994 American novels
Novels set in Oregon
Pendleton, Oregon
Viking Press books
Works by Ken Kesey